Abu-Bakarr Kargbo (born 21 December 1992) is a Sierra Leonean footballer who plays as a striker for German club Greifswalder FC.

Career
Kargbo rejected a move to English side Stoke City in 2012 having played two games for the under 21 side following his release by German side Hertha BSC that summer.

International career
Born in Sierra Leone, and raised in Germany, Kargbo was a youth international for Germany. On 17 March 2018, Kargbo was debuted for the Sierra Leone national football team in a friendly 4–0 loss to Iran.

References

External links
 
 

1992 births
People from Bo, Sierra Leone
Living people
Sierra Leonean footballers
Sierra Leone international footballers
German footballers
Germany youth international footballers
German people of Sierra Leonean descent
Association football forwards
SC Austria Lustenau players
Bayer 04 Leverkusen players
Bayer 04 Leverkusen II players
Hertha BSC players
Hertha BSC II players
FC Viktoria 1889 Berlin players
Berliner AK 07 players
Kickers Offenbach players
Regionalliga players
2. Liga (Austria) players
Sierra Leonean expatriate footballers
Expatriate footballers in Austria
Sierra Leonean expatriate sportspeople in Austria